Richard "Rich" Wilkes (born 1966) is an American filmmaker and musician. His work is noted for its rooting in contemporary music and youth culture.

Works

As Screenwriter 
Wilkes' major-studio debut was as screenwriter of the 1994 film Airheads. The story revolves around a group of loser musicians called The Lone Rangers who take a radio station hostage to get their song played on the radio. Airheads was directed by Michael Lehmann and distributed by 20th Century Fox.

This was followed by a co-writer credit (alongside director James Melkonian) for the 1994 comedy The Stoned Age, set in the stoner subculture of Southern California during the 1970s.

The same writing and directing team then collaborated with The Jerky Boys to create the 1995 production The Jerky Boys: The Movie, featuring the eponymous comedians (self-described as "low-lifes from Queens") as New York City youths who get into trouble with the Mafia when one of their prank calls leads them into a money laundering business.

Wilkes is credited as the sole screenwriter for the 2002 action-adventure film XXX and a "based on characters created by" credit as being as the creator of the XXX franchise.

Wilkes co-wrote the Mötley Crüe biopic The Dirt, based on the New York Times bestselling book by Neil Strauss and Mötley Crüe. The film took 17 years to get made. David Fincher was initially attached to direct in 2004, followed by Larry Charles in 2008.

As Writer/Director 
In 1995, Wilkes debuted as a director with Glory Daze, a semi-autobiographical tale based on his experiences as a student at the University of California, Santa Cruz.

Other Film Work 
Wilkes has also appeared as an actor in the majority of his productions, primarily in minor roles. He has also appeared as himself in several documentaries, including the 1998 production Independent's Day, 2003's The Blockbuster Imperative and 2006's Punk Like Me.

As Musician 
Wilkes was the lead singer of the "world's original punk rock mariachi band" Carne Asada. The band was put together as a prank to get on the Vans Warped Tour. The story of Carne Asada was told in the award winning music documentary Punk Like Me.

Personal life
Wilkes was born in Princeton, New Jersey. He attended El Camino High School in Oceanside, California. He got a Double-Inverted BA at the University of California, Santa Cruz, then studied screenwriting at the American Film Institute.

Filmography

Films

Television

References

External links

1966 births
Living people
American male screenwriters
People from Princeton, New Jersey
People from Oceanside, California
Screenwriters from California
Xxx from New Jersey